Hang Chat railway station is a railway station located in Hang Chat Subdistrict, Hang Chat District, Lampang. It is a class 3 railway station located 654.859 km from Bangkok railway station.

Train services 
 Local 407/408 Nakhon Sawan-Chiang Mai-Nakhon Sawan

References 
 
 

Railway stations in Thailand